Saša Maksimović (born 17 December 1976) is a politician in Serbia. He served in the National Assembly of Serbia from 2008 to 2016 and has been the mayor of Novi Bečej since 2016. Formerly a member of the far-right Serbian Radical Party (Srpska radikalna stranka, SRS), he has been a member of the Serbian Progressive Party (Srpska napredna stranka, SNS) since its founding in 2008.

Early life and career
Maksimović was born in Zrenjanin, Vojvodina, in what was then the Socialist Republic of Serbia in the Socialist Federal Republic of Yugoslavia. He was raised in Zrenjanin and Novi Bečej and trained as a food technology engineer.

Politician

Serbian Radical Party
Maksimović ran for the Novi Bečej municipal assembly in the 2000 Serbian local elections as the Radical Party's candidate in the fourth division. It is not clear from online sources if he was elected. The SRS won only one seat in the municipality in this electoral cycle.

Serbia switched to a system of proportional representation for local elections after 2000, and for the 2004 election cycle the country introduced the direct election of mayors. Maksimović appeared in the third position on the Radical Party's electoral list for Novi Bečej in the 2004 local elections and was elected when the list won eight mandates. In 2006, Novi Bečej's sitting mayor was defeated in a recall election, and Maksimović was the Radical Party's candidate in the mayoral by-election that followed. He received the most votes in the first round but was narrowly defeated in the run-off by Milivoj Vrebalov of the Liberal Democratic Party (Liberalno demokratska partija, LDP). The direct election of mayors was subsequently abandoned.

Maksimović appeared in the first position on the SRS's list for Novi Bečej in the 2008 local elections and received a new mandate after the list won nine seats. He also received the 127th position on the Radical Party's list in the concurrent 2008 Serbian parliamentary election and was awarded a mandate after the list won seventy-eight seats. (From 2000 to 2011, Serbian parliamentary mandates were awarded to sponsoring parties or coalitions rather than to individual candidates, and it was common practice for the mandates to be assigned out of numerical order. Maksimović's specific position on the list had no formal bearing on his chances of election.) While the overall result of the parliamentary election was initially inconclusive, a new government was eventually formed by the For a European Serbia alliance and the Socialist Party of Serbia (Socijalistička partija Srbije, SPS), and the Radicals served in opposition. Maksimović resigned his local mandate in the Novi Bečej assembly on 24 July 2008.

Serbian Progressive Party
The Radical Party experienced a serious split in late 2008, with several members joining the more moderate Serbian Progressive Party under the leadership of Tomislav Nikolić and Aleksandar Vučić. Maksimović sided with the Progressives.

Serbia's electoral system was reformed in 2011, such that mandates were awarded in numerical order to candidates on successful lists. Maksimović received the sixty-second position on the Progressive Party's Let's Get Serbia Moving list and was re-elected when the list won seventy-three mandates. The SNS formed a coalition government with the SPS after the election, and Maksimović served in parliament on the government side. He also appeared in the lead position on the SNS's list in the 2012 Serbian local elections in Novi Bečej and was re-elected when the list won eight mandates, narrowly losing to a coalition list led by the LDP. On this occasion, he served in both the republican and local parliaments. The Progressives joined the local coalition government in May 2013, and Maksimović became president (i.e., speaker) of the local parliament, serving in this role until October 2014.

He was given the 133rd position on the SNS's list in the 2014 Serbian parliamentary election and was elected to a third term when the list won a majority victory with 158 mandates. He did not seek re-election at the republic level in 2016.

Maksimović again appeared in the first position on the SNS's list in Novi Bečej for the 2016 Serbian local elections and, on this occasion, led the party to a plurality victory with fourteen out of thirty-one seats. The SNS formed a coalition government after the election, and Maksimović was chosen as mayor. He later led the list to a majority victory in the 2020 local elections and was confirmed for another term in office after the election.

In September 2021, he signed a deal with the neighbouring municipality of Kikinda for shared services in the field of animal hygiene.

Electoral record

Municipal (Novi Bečej)

References

1976 births
Living people
People from Zrenjanin
People from Novi Bečej
Mayors of places in Serbia
Members of the National Assembly (Serbia)
Serbian Radical Party politicians
Serbian Progressive Party politicians